Thomas Dougall (17 May 1921 – January 1997) was a Scottish professional footballer who played in the Football League for Sunderland and Brentford as an outside right. He later managed in non-League football.

Personal life 
Dougall was the son of footballer Jimmy Dougall.

Career statistics

References

1921 births
Scottish footballers
English Football League players
Brentford F.C. players
1997 deaths
Sportspeople from Wishaw
Association football outside forwards
Coventry City F.C. players
Guildford City F.C. players
Sunderland A.F.C. players
Yeovil Town F.C. players
Southern Football League players
Hillingdon Borough F.C. managers
Kingstonian F.C. managers
Southern Football League managers
Isthmian League managers
Scottish football managers

Tonbridge Angels F.C. players
Footballers from North Lanarkshire